John Walker (born 13 July 1951) is a former Australian rules footballer who played with Collingwood in the Victorian Football League (VFL).

Notes

External links 

1951 births
Australian rules footballers from Victoria (Australia)
Collingwood Football Club players
Dandenong Football Club players
Living people